Theodore P. Mansour (December 12, 1925October 13, 2003) was a Michigan politician.

Early life and education
Mansour was born in Flint, Michigan, on December 12, 1925. Mansour graduated from St. Mathews High
School in Flint, and later earned a B.A. from the University of Notre Dame.

Career
Mansour was a World War II veteran, serving in the war from 1944 to 1945. In 1968, Mansour served as supervisor of Flint Township, Michigan. At some point, Mansour served on the Genesee County Board of Commissioners and worked for the Genesee Intermediate School District. On November 3, 1970, Smith was elected to the Michigan House of Representatives where he represented the 83rd district from January 1, 1971, to January 1, 1973.

Personal life
Mansour was Catholic.

Death
Mansour died on October 13, 2003. His funeral services were held at Lady of Lebanon Catholic Church in Flint Township on October 17.

References

1925 births
2003 deaths
Catholics from Michigan
County commissioners in Michigan
Military personnel from Michigan
Politicians from Flint, Michigan
Democratic Party members of the Michigan House of Representatives
University of Notre Dame alumni
20th-century American politicians